Montgomery County is located in the State of Alabama. As of the 2020 census, its population was 228,954, making it the fifth-most populous county in Alabama. Its county seat is Montgomery, the state capital. Montgomery County is included in the Montgomery, AL Metropolitan Statistical Area.

History
Montgomery County was established by dividing Monroe County on December 6, 1816, by the Mississippi Territorial Legislature. It is named for Lemuel P. Montgomery, a young U.S. Army officer killed at the Battle of Horseshoe Bend, the final battle of the Creek Indian war, which was waged concurrently with the War of 1812.

The city of Montgomery, which is the county seat, is named for Richard Montgomery, an American Revolutionary War general killed in 1775 while attempting to capture Quebec City, Canada.

Over much of the 19th century great wealth was derived from the cotton crop, with the Civil War producing a temporary setback. More lasting trouble came in 1914 with the arrival of the boll weevil, which became very destructive to the cotton harvest from 1915 on. By the 1940s county farms earned more from cattle than cotton.

Geography

Major highways

 Interstate 65
 Interstate 85
 Interstate 685 (future)
 U.S. Highway 31
 U.S. Highway 80
 U.S. Highway 82
 U.S. Highway 231
 U.S. Highway 331
 State Route 21
 State Route 94
 State Route 108
 State Route 110
 State Route 126
 State Route 152
 State Route 271
 State Route 293

Adjacent counties
Elmore County (north)
Macon County (northeast)
Bullock County (east)
Pike County (southeast)
Crenshaw County (southwest)
Lowndes County (west)
Autauga County (northwest)

National protected area
 Selma to Montgomery National Historic Trail (part)

Demographics

2020

As of the 2020 United States census, there were 228,954 people, 88,864 households, and 53,155 families residing in the county.

2010
The 2010 United States census reported the following county population:

54.7% Black
39.5% White
3.6% Hispanic or Latino (of any race)
1.3% Two or more races
1.2% Asian 
0.3% Native American
0.0% Native Hawaiian or Pacific Islander

2000
As of the census of 2000, there were 223,510 persons, 86,068 households, and 56,804 families in the county. The population density was 283 persons per square mile (109/km2). There were 95,437 housing units, at an average density of 121 per square mile (47/km2). The racial makeup of the county was 48.85% White, 48.58% Black or African American, 0.99% Asian, 0.25% Native American, 0.03% Pacific Islander, 0.35% from other races, and 0.94% from two or more races. Hispanics and Latinos, of any race, made up 1.19% of the population.

By 2005, 52.5% of the population was black, 44.0% was non-Hispanic white, 1.4% was Hispanic, 1.2% was Asian, 0.2% was Native American, and 0.9% of the population reported two or more races. This excludes those who reported "some other race" and "white," because the Census Bureau reclassified all who reported "some other race" as white.

There were 86,068 households, 32.20% of which included children under the age of 18, 43.80% were married couples living together, 18.60% had a female householder with no husband present, and 34.00% were non-families. Single-persons households were 29.50% of the total; 9.40% had someone living alone who was 65 years of age or older. The average household size was 2.46. The average family size was 3.06.

Persons younger than 18 were 25.80% of the population; those 18–24, 11.70%; 25–44, 29.80%; 45–64, 20.90%; and 65 and older, 11.80%. The median age was 34 years. For every 100 females, there were 90.80 males. For every 100 females aged 18 and over, there were 86.70 males.

The median income for a household in the county was $35,962, and the median income for a family was $44,669. Males had a median income of $32,018; females, $24,921. The per capita income for the county was $19,358. About 13.50% of families and 17.30% of the population were below the poverty line, including 25.10% of those under age 18 and 13.70% of those 65 and older.

Government, politics and infrastructure
Montgomery County is governed by a five-member County Commission who are elected to four-year terms. The County Probate Judge regulates business such as drivers, marriage licences, and voting. The Probate Judge operates four offices: downtown Montgomery, Mobile HWY (Montgomery), Woodley Road (Montgomery), and Atlanta HWY (Montgomery).

The City of Montgomery, located inside Montgomery County, serves as the capital for the State of Alabama and is home to most state government agencies.

In the 2008 presidential election, Barack Obama won 62,166 votes, or 59 percent, while 42,031 votes (40 percent of those cast) were for John McCain

Infrastructure inside Montgomery County includes both Interstate 85 and 65 along with shipping hubs on the Alabama River and rail hubs located in the City of Montgomery. The Montgomery Regional Airport also serves as a major airport for the State of Alabama and the Southeastern US for passenger service, military aviation, and commercial aviation.

Education

Montgomery Public Schools operates public schools serving most of the county. However Pike Road City School District operates public schools in Pike Road. Additionally Maxwell Air Force Base is zoned to Department of Defense Education Activity (DoDEA) schools. The DoDEA operates Maxwell Air Force Base Elementary/Middle School. For high school Maxwell AFB residents are zoned to Montgomery Public Schools facilities.

The Montgomery City-County Public Library operates public libraries.

Universities/Colleges include:
 Huntingdon College
 Faulkner University
 Alabama State University
 Auburn University Montgomery
 Virginia College
 Amridge University
 H. Council Trenholm Tech
 United States Air War College
 Troy University Montgomery

Cultural sites
Montgomery County is home to many cultural and historic sites including:
 Alabama Shakespeare Festival
 Montgomery Museum of Fine Arts
 Montgomery Zoo
 Dexter Avenue Baptist Church
 Museum of Alabama (Alabama Department of Archives and History)
 Alabama State Capitol
 W. A. Gayle Planetarium
 Civil Rights Memorial
 First White House of the Confederacy
 Zelda and F. Scott Fitzgerald Museum
 Old Montgomery Greyhound Bus Station (Freedom Rides Museum)
 Rosa Parks Library and Museum

Communities

City
 Montgomery (county seat and largest municipality)

Town
 Pike Road

Unincorporated communities

 Ada
 Boylston
 Cecil
 Currys
 Dublin
 Grady
 Hope Hull
 Lapine (partly in Crenshaw County)
 Le Grand
 Mathews
 McDade
 Mount Meigs
 Pine Level
 Pintlala
 Ramer
 Red Level
 Snowdoun
 Waugh

See also

National Register of Historic Places listings in Montgomery County, Alabama
Properties on the Alabama Register of Landmarks and Heritage in Montgomery County, Alabama

References

Further reading
 Burton, Gary P., "The Founding Four Churches: An Overview of Baptist Beginnings in Montgomery County, Alabama," Baptist History and Heritage  (Spring 2012), 47#1 pp 39–51.

External links
The River Region Online
Fort Toulouse National Historic Site

 
Montgomery metropolitan area
1816 establishments in Mississippi Territory
Populated places established in 1816
Black Belt (U.S. region)
Majority-minority counties in Alabama